Sardar Kamal Khan Chang (born 12 March 1972) is a Pakistani politician who had been a member of the National Assembly of Pakistan, from June 2013 to May 2018.

Political career
He served as district nazim of Badin.

He was elected to the National Assembly of Pakistan as a candidate of Pakistan Peoples Party (PPP) from Constituency NA-224 (Badin-cum-Tando Muhammad Khan-I) in the 2013 Pakistani general election. He received 88,365 votes and defeated Ali Asghar Halepoto, a candidate of Pakistan Muslim League (F) (PML-F).

References

Living people
Pakistan People's Party politicians
Sindhi people
Pakistani MNAs 2013–2018
People from Sindh
1972 births